The Virtual Console is a line of downloadable video games for Nintendo's Wii and Wii U home video game consoles and the Nintendo 3DS handheld game console.

The Virtual Console lineup consists of titles originally released on past home and handheld consoles. These titles are run in their original forms through software emulation (excluding GBA titles on the 3DS), therefore remaining mostly unaltered, and can be purchased from the Wii Shop Channel or Nintendo eShop for between 500 and 1200 Wii Points. They can also be purchased using real currency for $2.99 and $9.99 (3DS) and $4.99 and $9.99 (Wii U), depending on the system, rarity, and/or demand. Virtual Console's library of past games currently consists of titles originating from the Nintendo Entertainment System, Super Nintendo Entertainment System, Game Boy, Game Boy Color, Nintendo 64, Game Boy Advance, and Nintendo DS, as well as Sega's Master System, Genesis/Mega Drive and Game Gear, NEC's TurboGrafx-16, and SNK's Neo Geo AES. The service for the Wii also included games for platforms that were known only in select regions, such as the Commodore 64 (Europe and North America) and Microsoft's and ASCII's MSX (Japan), as well as Virtual Console Arcade, which allowed players to download video arcade games. Virtual Console titles have been downloaded over ten million times. The distribution of past games through the Virtual Console is one of Nintendo's reasons for opposing software piracy of old console games.

On January 30, 2019, the Virtual Console service was discontinued on the Wii, following the shutdown of the Wii Shop Channel.

On March 27, 2023, the Virtual Console service will be discontinued on the Wii U and Nintendo 3DS. Purchased titles will remain playable.

List of Virtual Console games

Japan

There were 38 Famicom, Super Famicom, Nintendo 64, Sega Mega Drive, and PC Engine games available at launch on the Wii Virtual Console for the Japanese region. The Nintendo 3DS Virtual Console launched with 7 Game Boy and Game Boy Color titles. New Virtual Console software is added on Tuesdays (Wii) and Wednesdays (Nintendo 3DS, Wii U) at 2:00PM JST and there are currently 659 titles for the Wii, 244 titles for the 3DS (256 for Nintendo 3DS Ambassadors) and 466 titles for the Wii U available.

North America

There were 12 total NES, SNES, N64, and Sega Genesis games available at launch on the Wii Virtual Console for the North American region. Two TurboGrafx-16 titles were added two days later on November 21, 2006. The Nintendo 3DS Virtual Console launched with 4 Game Boy and Game Boy Color titles. North America saw its first release of Commodore 64 games on the service on February 23, 2009, and its first Virtual Console Arcade games on March 25, 2009. As of January 26, 2017, there were 398 titles for the Wii, 172 title for the 3DS (184 including those available for Nintendo 3DS Ambassadors and Donkey Kong: Original Edition) and 267 titles for the Wii U available.

Though the Virtual Console lineup initially only covered games that had been released in North America, George Harrison indicated in an interview that there was a possibility that Nintendo or other Virtual Console providers would localize Japanese games that have never been released in English. This later came to reality, and former Japan-only games have appeared on the North American Virtual Console. The first game to be added with such localization was Sin and Punishment for the Nintendo 64. While other previous Japan-only titles had been released through the Virtual Console prior to this, the first being Battle Lode Runner from the TurboGrafx-16, added on April 23, 2007, this and all others were originally written in English and required no localization. Despite the fact others fit the category, there are currently 25 titles listed under the "Import" genre with 1 removed: Sin and Punishment, Super Mario Bros.: The Lost Levels (previously available in North America as part of Super Mario All-Stars), Ninja JaJaMaru-kun, Alien Soldier (although the game was previously available in North America through the Sega Channel), DoReMi Fantasy: Milon's DokiDoki Adventure, Puyo Puyo 2, Bio Miracle Bokutte Upa, Dig Dug, Gley Lancer, Super Fantasy Zone, Break In, Star Parodier (Removed), Cho Aniki, Final Soldier, Digital Champ: Battle Boxing, Gradius II: Gofer no Yabou, Bomberman '94, Detana!! TwinBee, Wonder Boy III: Monster Lair, Pulseman, Secret Command, Street Fighter II: Champion Edition, Castlevania: Rondo of Blood, Ironclad, Ufouria: The Saga and Monster World IV. Furthermore, at least two import titles (DoReMi Fantasy and Puyo Puyo 2) were released without any English translation, and thus only Japanese text is available in these games while Monster World IV was fully translated to English.

PAL region

A total of 17 NES, SNES, N64, Sega Mega Drive and TurboGrafx titles were available at launch on the Virtual Console in Europe and 11 titles for the Oceanic region (TurboGrafx games were first added there from July 6, 2007). As of December 8, 2016, there are 385 titles in Europe and 384 titles in Australia and New Zealand for the Wii, 168 titles for Nintendo 3DS (178 for Nintendo 3DS Ambassadors) and 258 titles for Wii U available.

Though the Virtual Console titles primarily cover only the games that have been released in Europe, Nintendo UK has commented that there is a possibility that in the future, Nintendo will localize Japanese and North American games that have never been released in Europe such as Super Mario RPG, which was released on the European Virtual Console on August 22, 2008, after being unreleased in that region for 12 years. In March 2007, Hudson released three TurboGrafx games which were not originally released in Europe: Double Dungeons, Dragon's Curse, and Battle Lode Runner. Five Hanabi Festivals have been held since, releasing former Japanese and/or North American exclusive titles.

Wii

Library history
The first few Virtual Console games were released to the Wii Shop Channel on November 19, 2006, alongside the launch of the Wii.

While the gameplay remains unchanged for all of the classic titles offered for the Virtual Console, Nintendo has stated that some games may be improved with sharper graphics or better frame rates. In reality, however, many games suffer from drops in frame rate or have graphical glitches not present in the original, and many PAL SNES games run with significantly reduced borders compared to the original cartridge releases. As with disc-based games, the Virtual Console service is region-locked—that is, different versions of games are provided to different regions, and game availability may vary from region to region.

Nintendo stated that the Wii Shop Channel would not be used exclusively for retro games, and WiiWare games have appeared in North America as of May 12, 2008. These original games are made available through the WiiWare part of the Wii Shop Channel, as opposed to through the Virtual Console.

Satoru Iwata stated in a speech on March 23, 2006, that Nintendo, Sega, and Hudson Soft were working in collaboration to bring a "best of" series of games to the Wii. At E3 2006, Hudson also declared it would bring upwards of 100 titles to the Wii's Virtual Console. Additionally, Hudson mentioned that its lawyers were working on acquiring the licenses to games from now defunct companies. Nintendo announced MSX compatibility on September 19, 2006, announcing on February 23, 2007, that the MSX titles Eggy and Aleste would be released in Japan. In February 2007, a heading for Neo Geo AES games was added to the Japanese Virtual Console page, and in September of that same year, games for that system appeared on the list of future releases, priced at 900 points each. Also in September Hudson announced that games made for the TurboGrafx-CD format would also join the Virtual Console beginning in October 2007, with five titles to be released for the remainder of 2007 and ten titles for 2008, each priced at 800 points.

On June 1, 2007, Nintendo of America issued a press release to announce the upcoming release of its 100th Virtual Console title, which was Zelda II: The Adventure of Link. Within this press release, Nintendo stated that more than 4.7 million Virtual Console games had been downloaded, at a rate of more than 1,000 titles an hour.

Neo Geo AES support was added on September 18, 2007, for the Japanese Virtual Console, becoming the first addition to the list of consoles since the TurboGrafx-16 was added two days after the U.S. launch.

On October 9, 2007, Nintendo announced that 7.8 million Virtual Console titles had been downloaded, and as of December 2007, this number topped ten million.

Games from several new past consoles were added during 2008: Master System on February 26, 2008, for Japan's Virtual Console; Commodore 64 support was added on March 28, 2008, for Europe's Virtual Console. and MSX support was added on May 27, 2008, for Japan's Virtual Console.

On February 23, 2009, the first three Commodore 64 titles (International Karate, The Last Ninja and Pitstop II) were added to the North America Virtual Console for the first time.

On March 25, 2009, simultaneously with Nintendo's Keynote Speech at Game Developers Conference, Nintendo launched 'Virtual Console Arcade', launching with four titles, Mappy, The Tower of Druaga, Star Force and Gaplus.

On February 4, 2011, Sega announced that a Virtual Console release of Puyo Puyo, released in Japan in Spring 2011, is the first Virtual Console to feature Wi-Fi support for online multiplayer.

The Wii Shop Channel has functionality to allow games to be updated. This has been used four times so far to update Military Madness, Star Fox 64/Lylat Wars, Kirby 64: The Crystal Shards (in North America and Europe), and Mario Kart 64 (in Europe and Australia). Several NES and SNES games released before March 30, 2007, have also been given updates in Europe and Australia to fix previous problems with the Wii component cables. These updates are free of charge to those who have downloaded a previous version of the game.

In later years, some games have been removed from the service due to their licenses expiring, namely R-Type and Teenage Mutant Ninja Turtles, among others. The three Donkey Kong Country SNES games produced by Rare were unknowingly withdrawn. Since Nintendo retains the rights to these games, the reason for their removal remained unknown, however, they have since been released on the Wii U eShop and were also added back to the Wii Shop Channel around the same time as well. Sonic the Hedgehog and its sequel Sonic the Hedgehog 2 were both removed in Japan in 2012. While the games returned to the Wii Shop Channel in 2013, they were removed yet again on October 30, 2015, on the Japanese Wii Shop Channel and Xbox Live Arcade in that region while the 3D Classics versions ported by M2 are still available on the Nintendo 3DS for download via the 3DS eShop. However, both North America and Europe still have both games available to download on the Wii Shop Channel and Xbox Live Arcade. While these and other removed titles can no longer be found or purchased from the Shop Channel, they remain available to those who have purchased them prior to their removal. Such users may still re-download them on their Wii consoles and even transfer them to a Wii U system using the "system transfer" tool. Any Wii Virtual Console titles can be transferred to the Wii U and played via its Wii Mode.

Control

Virtual Console games can be played using different controllers. The Wii Remote itself (turned on its side) can be used for NES, Master System, TurboGrafx-16, and some Mega Drive/Genesis and Neo Geo AES games. The original and the pro versions of Classic Controller (sold separately from the console) can be used for all Virtual Console games. The controllers from the GameCube can also be used for all games on the Virtual Console, except for some multiplayer TurboGrafx-16 games that use the GameCube controller for the fifth player. As a result of this, the wireless GameCube controller (the WaveBird) has seen increased popularity.

All Virtual Console games have their buttons mapped to the respective buttons on the controllers, however, in certain circumstances, users can use X and Y instead of A and B, if the original controller does not have X and Y buttons (for example the NES). In certain titles, such as Nintendo 64 games, there may be specific controls tailored to the Classic Controller or GameCube Controller. Nintendo 64 titles that originally provided force feedback via the Nintendo 64 controller's Rumble Pak peripheral, however, are not supported by the built-in "Rumble" feature of the Wii Remote (with a Classic Controller attached) and the GameCube controller, which also happened to make a certain optional item in The Legend of Zelda: Ocarina of Time useless.

With the release of Bomberman '93, it was revealed that TurboGrafx-16 games can support full five-player games. Since a single Wii can only have four Wii Remotes and four GameCube controllers connected at the same time, a combination of the two are needed for five-player games. The same issue is found in 5-8 player Commodore 64 games as well. Because the Wii U doesn't have GameCube controller ports, only up to four-player games can be played on the system.

MSX games also support USB keyboards, as the original system featured their input. However, Commodore 64 titles use a pop-up "virtual" keyboard, which can be toggled on and off by pressing the "1" button on the Wii Remote, and are only used to set up the game and are not for input during gameplay.

Titles

Storage
Games downloaded from the Virtual Console library can be stored in the Wii's built-in 512 MB flash memory.

Wii system software versions 2.0 and later allow Virtual Console and WiiWare games to be moved from the console's internal memory to a removable SD card and then back to the same console.
Wii Menu 4.0 added a new menu to run channels from an SD card provided there is enough free space to hold a copy of the channel in internal memory. If the console runs out of memory, the SD menu will offer to move other channels to the SD card.

Virtual Console games are locked to the Wii on which they were purchased—they cannot be transferred to another Wii via an SD card, although it is possible to purchase games in the Wii Shop Channel and send them as gifts to people on their Wii Friends list. This procedure does not work across regions and it has been reported that bought titles cannot be sent to users from other countries either, even if they are on the same region. In the event that a Wii is damaged and the Virtual Console games can no longer be played, Nintendo will provide support (if the serial number or console email name can be provided).  Also, if a Wii owner transfers all data on their console to a Wii U, the ability to download those titles from the Wii Shop Channel, along with all save data currently on the Wii, is transferred.

Game saves and save data
Game saving is functional and intact on the Virtual Console for all games which originally had a save feature on their cartridge.  Saved games are saved to the Wii Internal Memory and function exactly as the original cartridge did. A game that in its original cartridge form did not have any form of save feature will not have any save game feature on the Virtual Console (though depending on its original system it may have the suspend feature as described below).

Most first-party N64 games used internal cartridge memory for game save data and thus will save properly on the Virtual Console. A select few first-party and nearly all other N64 game cartridges utilized the extra memory capability of the N64 Controller Pak. Saving of data to the Controller Pak is not supported by the Virtual Console, so for those games which used this feature, the save feature will not work properly in the Virtual Console.

An extreme example is that of Mario Kart 64 which uses internal cartridge memory for progress and save game data. Consequently, all progress is saved properly (since it was saved to the cartridge itself) but one of the features in Mario Kart 64 (saving ghosts for racing at a later date) will not work, since that particular feature utilized the Controller Pak, and the option to copy data to the Controller Pak won't function in those games.

Suspending play
Like other emulation software, the Wii Virtual Console enables the user to suspend play of a game at any time. To do this, users simply return to the Wii main menu from the game.  Two exceptions to this are the N64 and Neo Geo AES, titles which do not support this feature.  The N64 will allow play to be halted by returning to the Wii Menu but will require the person to start from the title screen to continue playing.  Note that suspending play enables the player to pause the game indefinitely but does not function as a "save state" in that, once the game is resumed, the user will be able to pause play again (overwriting the suspend point) but will not be able to return to the previously suspended state.

The suspend feature will not be available if the user resets the Wii with the reset button on the front of the console during gameplay.  Further, if the Wii loses power during gameplay, there is no further suspend state, nor will there be a way to restart from the previous suspend state. There are some exceptions, however. Arcade games released by Bandai Namco feature an updated menu and when reset during gameplay, the save state will be saved before the console is reset.

South Korea releases

There were 10 titles total of NES, Super NES, and Nintendo 64 games available at launch on the Virtual Console for South Korea. The store updates irregularly on Tuesdays. There are 40 titles available. Depending on the game, they are playable in either Japanese or English. Super Mario World is the only game that can be bought in either language. Companies currently supporting by publishing games are Bandai Namco Entertainment, Hudson Soft, Irem, Konami, Nintendo, Taito and Windysoft.

Taiwan and Hong Kong releases

Since Nintendo of Taiwan and Nintendo of Hong Kong never offered a Chinese version of the Wii console in Hong Kong or Taiwan, they have released Japanese Wii's in that region and by hardware extensions, the Japanese Virtual Console is also available for customers in Taiwan and Hong Kong and like other regions are able to buy Japanese Nintendo Points cards at certain retailers.

Nintendo 3DS

Library history
On June 6, 2011, Nintendo launched the Virtual Console service for the Nintendo 3DS on the Nintendo eShop. Games released for the service include titles for the Game Boy, Game Boy Color, NES, Super NES (New Nintendo 3DS only), Game Gear and TurboGrafx-16 games (available in Japan only). There are also special features available while playing Virtual Console games, such as viewing classic Game Boy titles with the traditional green screen or viewing them in an emulated border.

A separate, but related set of games are 3D Classics, which are remakes of classic titles that make use of the Nintendo 3DS's stereoscopic 3D capabilities.

When asked if Virtual Boy games were going to be available for download on the Virtual Console for the Nintendo 3DS, Nintendo of America President Reggie Fils-Aimé told Kotaku that he couldn't answer, as he was unfamiliar with the platform.

The author of the piece, Kotaku's Stephen Totilo, called upon readers to "argue for a Virtual Boy store on the Nintendo 3DS, if you can."

In response to an August 2011 price drop on the Nintendo 3DS hardware, Nintendo announced plans to give early adopters of the system a number of Virtual Console releases as appreciation of their support. Owners of the system who logged into the Nintendo eShop by a specified time in their home markets became "Nintendo 3DS Ambassadors". In September 2011, ten NES titles were made available through Virtual Console to the Ambassadors at no cost before their general release; the games included marquee titles such as Super Mario Bros. and The Legend of Zelda. They were released to the general public for purchase at a later date, with additional features such as simultaneous multiplayer across multiple systems; Ambassadors received the new features as free software updates. On December 16, 2011, Ambassadors received access to ten Game Boy Advance titles, also at no charge, that are not scheduled to be released to those who are not Ambassadors.
Unlike other Virtual Console-branded releases, GBA games are not emulated, but rather they run directly on an ARM7TDMI processor core; the "AGB_FIRM" kernel running on the other CPUs is responsible for emulating the Game Pak, applying a video filter, and allowing the brightness to be adjusted or the game quit without manually rebooting the 3DS.
Many save types supported by AGB_FIRM (many of them having been discovered in September 2017, after injection became convenient and accessible to most users of custom firmware) were not employed in the ten official GBA releases, but can be used by games unofficially "injected" into a GBA VC title.

On February 1, 2012, Punch-Out!! the first non-ambassador NES game was released on the Virtual Console service. Since then, other NES games that were not part of the ambassador program were released including third party games by Capcom, Konami, and Tecmo such as; Mega Man, Castlevania, and Ninja Gaiden. Furthermore, two NES import titles were added in North American and Europe; Summer Carnival '92 Recca and The Mysterious Murasame Castle in both 2013 and 2014, respectively. As of January 2017, Game Boy Advance games have not been released to non-Ambassadors on the Nintendo 3DS.

TurboGrafx-16/PC Engine games were added to the service in Japan starting with Gradius and China Warrior on December 25, 2013, in Japan. R-Type and Alien Crush were later added a few months later in February, the following year. As of now, no new TG-16 games have been added to the Virtual Console service.

On November 12, 2015, it was announced that during a Nintendo Direct that Pokémon Red, Pokémon Blue, and Pokémon Yellow would be released on the Virtual Console service on February 27, 2016, to celebrate the 20th anniversary of the series. The games will feature Local Play for trading Pokémon and battling, replacing the game link cable due to the Nintendo 3DS having wireless connections, but Game Boy Printer features in Pokémon Yellow, like other titles on the Virtual Console, will still not be usable on the Nintendo 3DS.

On March 4, 2016, during a Nintendo Direct, Nintendo announced the addition of SNES games on Virtual Console for New Nintendo 3DS. Taking advantage of its upgraded hardware on the New 3DS, the games support "Perfect Pixel mode", which allows these games to be played at their original resolution and aspect ratio. SNES games are not supported on the original Nintendo 3DS models or Nintendo 2DS.

Titles

Storage
Virtual Console games are saved on an SD card and are accessible through the Nintendo 3DS home menu.

Game saves and save data
The save feature for the Nintendo 3DS Virtual console service is similar to the Wii's. However, unlike the Wii's, the games can save a single "restore point" that can be used as much as the player wants to but is replaced and overwritten if the player makes another one.

South Korea releases

Before the Nintendo 3DS Virtual Console officially fully launched in South Korea, the New Nintendo 3DS Super Mario Bros. 30th Anniversary bundle came with the Virtual Console version of Super Mario Bros. pre-installed. The full launch includes six games with three being for the NES and three of them being for Game Boy.

Taiwan and Hong Kong releases

Nintendo of Hong Kong launched the Virtual Console in Taiwan and Hong Kong for the first time in Nintendo 3DS/Nintendo 3DS XL systems in Chinese, their first releases are the Japanese versions of Pokémon Red, Pokémon Blue, Pokémon Green and Pokémon Yellow for Game Boy on the same day of the Japanese release on February 27, 2016. The Pure White Nintendo 3DS released in Taiwan & Hong Kong uses the Japanese region firmware but all online features are blocked so the Japanese Nintendo eShop can't be used and likewise the Japanese Virtual Console can't be used either.

Wii U

Library history
In January 2013, Nintendo announced a native version of Virtual Console, which would be launched for Wii U on April 26, 2013, in North America and April 27, 2013, in the United Kingdom. Initial releases came from the NES and Super NES libraries, with Game Boy Advance titles being made available starting April 3, 2014, with Nintendo 64 and Nintendo DS being added starting April 1, 2015. Unlike with the Wii, titles originally released on the arcades and non-Nintendo consoles (with the exception of the TurboGrafx-16) were not offered.

In a July 2011 interview, Nintendo's Amber McCollum stated that select GameCube titles would be made available for download on the Wii U console via the Wii U's own Nintendo eShop. However, no titles have been made available.

Wii U Virtual Console titles include the option to use Off-TV Play on the Wii U GamePad and Miiverse integration. Users who own the Wii Virtual Console version of a game will be able to get the Wii U Virtual Console version of that game for a discounted price. Nintendo also announced some individual games would be released prior to the full Virtual Console launch as part of a special promotion celebrating the 30th anniversary of the release of the Famicom. Existing Wii Virtual Console games can be accessed via the Wii Mode. The UK Virtual Console service offers versions of games from both North America and Japan, in lieu of slower PAL versions. On December 25, 2013, TurboGrafx-16/PC Engine and MSX titles were added to the service in Japan. In January 2014, Nintendo announced Nintendo DS games for the Wii U Virtual Console. In June 2014, the Nintendo DS game Dr. Kawashima's Brain Training: How Old Is Your Brain? was released on the Wii U Virtual Console in Japan and PAL regions. On April 1, 2015, immediately after a Nintendo Direct announcing them, Nintendo DS and Nintendo 64 games were added to the Wii U Virtual Console. On June 14, 2015, prior to Nintendo's E3 presentation; Mother was released worldwide and for the first time in North America and Europe on the Virtual Console service, under the title "EarthBound Beginnings". It was previously going to be released in North America back in 1990, but was cancelled due to the Super NES already on its way, causing Nintendo to move on. The game had been fully translated in English. On July 14, 2016, TurboGrafx-16 support was finally added to the North American Virtual Console, launching with three games; Bonk's Adventure, New Adventure Island, and R-Type. Anyone who had downloaded them via the Wii Shop Channel on the Wii or Wii Mode, would get those titles discounted, between $2.99-3.99. TurboGrafx-16 support was added to the European Virtual Console, just two weeks later on June 28, 2016.

Control

Titles

Storage
Virtual Console games are saved either on the Wii U's flash storage (8GB or 32GB) or can be saved on a USB flash drive or external hard drive.

Game saves and save data
The save feature for the Wii U Virtual console service is similar to the Wii's. However, unlike the Wii's, the games can save a single "restore point" that can be used as much as the player wants to, but is replaced and overwritten if the player makes another one. Game saves from Wii Virtual Console games cannot be transferred to the Wii U versions.

Nintendo Switch

The Nintendo Switch family of systems does not use the "Virtual Console" label for the digital distribution of its older games from past platforms, instead releasing titles to subscribers of the Nintendo Switch Online subscription service. Some third party companies have opted to release past games via the Switch's eShop as well, such Arcade Archives and Sega Ages banners.

Third-party support
Unnamed Nintendo employees have reportedly speculated that licensing issues will be a predominant factor in determining whether a game is available for Virtual Console, giving the examples of GoldenEye 007 and Tetris as games that might be too expensive to license for the Virtual Console. Tecmo has announced its plans to "aggressively" support Virtual Console by re-releasing classic games. Though Tecmo did not specify which titles it intended to release, the company is responsible for many retro classics, such as Ninja Gaiden, Rygar, and Tecmo Bowl. Tecmo was the first third-party game developer to release a game on the Virtual Console (Solomon's Key for the NES). Since then, Capcom and Konami, among others, have also released titles. In 2015, Sega released Sonic Advance, the first Sonic title for the Wii U Virtual Console, but so far, only in Japan. It is unknown if the game will be released in North America and Europe.

Matt Casamassina of IGN reported that Rare titles absent of Nintendo-owned characters, such as Banjo-Kazooie and Perfect Dark, would be unavailable for purchase due to Microsoft's acquisition of Rare; SNK has announced intentions to release the Samurai Shodown series and a few other games to the Virtual Console which has brought the Neo Geo AES to the list of consoles available. Midway had also planned to bring the classic Mortal Kombat games to the Virtual Console, but later sold the franchise to Warner Bros. Interactive Entertainment when it filed for bankruptcy in 2009. Warner Bros. has not stated whether it will release the Mortal Kombat games to the Virtual Console. However, it was stated by Ed Boon (co-creator of Mortal Kombat) on his Twitter account that the SNES Mortal Kombat games have "0.0" chance of happening.

Differences from original games
Nintendo has stated that the Virtual Console releases will be faithful to the original games, eliminating the possibility of graphical enhancements, customizable controls, or added online multiplayer features. However, for various reasons, the gameplay experience is not always identical to the original.

Peripherals
Some Nintendo 64 games offered optional features that required peripheral hardware, such as the Rumble Pak for force feedback and the Controller Pak for additional data storage. Because these peripherals are not emulated or simulated in the Wii Virtual Console, the games played on the Virtual Console as they would on the Nintendo 64 without the peripherals attached. In particular, Mario Kart 64 cannot save "Ghost Data" since no Controller Pak is available, Cruis'n USA still allows saving game data but data cannot be copied to a Controller Pak. Wave Race 64 still has the ability to save progress but like Cruis'n USA the copy ability that allowed data to be copied to the Controller Pak cannot be used. Similarly, both Mario Golf and Mario Tennis cannot use a Transfer Pak to copy data to or from a real Game Boy Color or the 3DS Virtual Console running the respective companion game.

Three Famicom games—Excitebike, Mach Rider and Wrecking Crew—included the ability to save player-designed levels via the Famicom Data Recorder. Since this peripheral was never released outside Japan, the NES versions of these games did not support this save feature. Despite this, all three games have had the feature implemented in their Virtual Console releases for Wii and Wii U, allowing players to save course data to the system's memory or an SD card; however, these features are not present in the Virtual Console releases of Mach Rider and Wrecking Crew for Nintendo 3DS, although the 3D Classics release 3D Excitebike does retain this feature as it is not a Virtual Console release.

The N64 game Pokémon Snap allowed players to take their Game Paks to special in-store kiosks to print stickers of their in-game photos; the Virtual Console version emulates this by letting players send a photo to the Wii Message Board once per day but this was removed from the Wii U version. Also, the Virtual Console versions of The Legend of Zelda: Link's Awakening DX (Game Boy Color) and Super Mario Bros. Deluxe (Game Boy Color) on the Nintendo 3DS cannot print photos from either game, since this required the Game Boy Printer peripheral to be attached throughout both games and any features that required use of the Game Boy Color Infrared port can't be used since the 3DS uses different infrared technology from the Game Boy Color.

Controllers
Some reviewers have reported that games play differently due to the different controllers. For example, Super Mario World is often cited as being more difficult to play due to the GameCube controller's button mapping. The Classic Controller has a button layout more like that of the Super NES controller, and an adapter has been released that enables a player to plug an actual Super NES controller into one of the Wii's GameCube controller ports. Similarly, most N64 Virtual Console games have mapped the Z button to the L, ZL and ZR buttons and the C-buttons to the right analog stick on the Classic Controller, which some reviewers have described as awkward. Furthermore, the mapping of the left analog stick for N64 Virtual Console games does not use the full range of the stick, and instead uses a range of approximately 67%, likely due to the differences in design of the N64 controller's control stick and the GameCube style analog stick. This has been noted to provide a significantly different sensitivity when compared to the original N64 mapping.

Virtual Console releases of Game Boy and Game Boy Color games on the Nintendo 3DS give the player the option to play the games as they appeared on their original hardware. By holding a button combination while launching the game, the 3DS presents the game in its original resolution rather than upscaling it to fit the height of the screen, making it appear smaller but more crisp. Game Gear games can also be played in the original resolution by changing the screen settings on the touch screen menu. Monochrome Game Boy games can be displayed in both "black and white" and "black and dark green" color palettes, switchable during gameplay.

Content
While virtually all Virtual Console games play identically to their original versions, some games have been altered cosmetically to address licensing and copyright issues. Tecmo Bowl (NES) originally included the names of real football players licensed from the NFL Players Association, but since the game's release, Electronic Arts obtained exclusive rights to the license; consequently, the names were removed from the Virtual Console version, with only the players' numbers being shown. Likewise, Wave Race 64—which featured Kawasaki logos on the title screen, jetskis and ad banners—had the logos removed from the title screen and jetskis, and the banners replaced with Wii and Nintendo DS banners due to licensing issues with Kawasaki. The Mega Drive/Genesis game The Revenge of Shinobi originally featured Spider-Man as a boss character, but because the license to that character had expired, the 2009 release for Virtual Console removes the Marvel copyright notice and changes the character to pink, but retains all of Spider-Man's behaviors and patterns. The Virtual Console release of StarTropics (NES) changes the name of one weapon from "Island Yo-Yo" to "Island Star", since Yo-Yo is a trademarked term in Canada.

Other games have experienced minor graphical differences from their original versions as well; most of these changes (as well as several others) were done due to Nintendo being more cautious about epilepsy, since many of the games during that time employed high flickering of color patterns that engulfed the screen. F-Zero (SNES) eliminates the track dimming when the player runs over the edges of the track, and Nintendo 64 games render polygons at a higher resolution than in their original hardware (though sprites and text appear blocky and pixelated by comparison). In Zelda II: The Adventure of Link, the screen turns red upon the player losing a life, whereas the original employed a rapid screen flash (Nintendo has yet to use such an effect since the Dennō Senshi Porygon incident in 1997).

The Wii and Wii U Virtual Console release of The Legend of Zelda (NES) uses the updated version featured in 2003's The Legend of Zelda: Collector's Edition compilation for the GameCube. While the gameplay is identical to the 1986 original, this release includes the save screen from the Famicom Disk System version, as well as an updated translation of the introduction screen.

The Wii U Virtual Console releases of the NES games appear to have been anti-aliased, resulting in some characters appearing more rounded or blurred compared to their original, Wii, and 3DS Virtual Console releases. The Wii U Game Boy Advance games have the graphics similarly smoothed, but give the player the option to toggle this effect on or off.
 
One significant difference in gameplay occurred in Kid Icarus (NES), which had its password system altered to disable certain special passwords that gave the main character special powers or large amounts of money. Many players did not like this change, and the later release of Metroid, which used a similar password system, retained its original behavior. Similarly, Mario Golf originally had a code to enable password input for special tournaments, but had this feature removed for Virtual Console.

The title Donkey Kong: Original Edition was available via promotion on the Wii and 3DS Virtual Consoles, then later was made purchasable on the PAL Nintendo 3DS eShop. This game is a modified version of the NES release of Donkey Kong to more closely resemble the arcade version, and was originally featured as a mini-game in Donkey Kong 64. Both the NES version and Original Edition are available on the PAL Nintendo 3DS eShop. Despite never actually being released on the NES, the game is treated as an NES title but simply lists "Never Released" in place of the original release year.

Wii U Game Boy Advance games do not support multiplayer modes, Game Boy Player rumble features, sleep mode, or GameCube-connectivity. Similarly, Nintendo DS games made available on Virtual Console are identical to their original release, complete with Nintendo Wi-Fi Connection set-up screens; however, as the wireless features are not emulated, attempting to use online play or local wireless multiplayer features (such as in Mario Kart DS) will not function, especially as the original service had been terminated about eleven months prior to the Virtual Console debut.

The Wii U Virtual Console re-release of Super Mario Advance 4: Super Mario Bros. 3 features all of the levels from the World-e section of the game unlocked automatically, including levels only released in Japan. This is done by a modified version of the game, where the levels are contained in the game's data and unlocked automatically. In the original game, the levels were unlocked using cards purchasable at various stores, which had dot codes on them containing the level data, and when scanned by the Nintendo e-Reader peripheral, saved the level to the game's save data for later usage without the card. While the original game could only fit 32 levels at any given time, the Virtual Console version has 38 levels in total, which includes every e-Reader card level ever released.

The Wii U Virtual Console re-release of Animal Crossing: Wild World removes the requirement to have someone visit your town and buy an item from Tom Nook's shop in order to upgrade to Nookingtons.

Game Boy games & Game Boy Color games on the 3DS Virtual Console don't support multiplayer modes or the Game Boy Color Infrared link feature (except for Pokémon Red, Blue, Yellow, Gold, Silver, and Crystal). Game Boy Color games also don't support Game Boy Printer features, and N64 Connectivity. NES Games also don't support Famicom data recorder features in games such as Mach Rider and Wrecking Crew.

Languages
Certain games that were originally released only in Japan have been translated and released in other regions on Virtual Console. Sin and Punishment (N64), which had never been released in English but featured English voice acting, was released on the Virtual Console in North American and PAL regions; all menu commands and certain in-game text (all originally written in Japanese) were translated into English, but the game retains its Japanese title screen and dialogue subtitles. The Mysterious Murasame Castle (NES), and Summer Carnival '92: Recca (NES), which had never been released in English, were released in English on the Nintendo 3DS Virtual Console in 2014. At least one game was fully translated, Monster World IV for the Mega Drive/Genesis was fully translated to English for both North American and European PAL regions.

Criticism
Wired'''s Chris Kohler protested the disparity between the American and Japanese libraries, both in quantity and quality. The difference between the two libraries became minimal at one point, leading him to change his stance, only to change it back once more as North American releases began to slow. In addition, Kohler has also criticized the overall release strategy, with a handful of games at the beginning and two or three every week. The pricing has also been criticized as too high, especially for the NES games, given the prices of many of the games available as used and the near-zero costs of manufacture and distribution.

PAL issues
With the launch of the Wii in territories using the PAL television system, it has become apparent that in most cases the games supplied for the Virtual Console run in 50 Hz mode and in their original unoptimized state. Unoptimized PAL games run roughly 17% slower than their original speed in 60 Hz and have borders covering the top and the bottom of the screen. Setting the Wii console to 60 Hz mode does not force the 50 Hz game into 60 Hz mode (as is possible on emulators and modified PAL consoles).

All currently released Nintendo 64 games are partially PAL optimized, resulting in full screen games (although still running in 50 Hz and locked to the original slower gameplay speed). This optimization was not the case for the original cartridge versions of Super Mario 64, Wave Race 64 or Mario Kart 64, making the Virtual Console versions superior in that regard.

Additionally, some Super NES games are also partially PAL optimized with reduced borders but still retaining the slower run speed of the original PAL release (Super Mario World, Super Probotector and Street Fighter II).

A select few games were already optimized in the original release to begin with, and are thus just as fast as their 60 Hz counterparts this time around (the most obvious examples being Donkey Kong Country and Donkey Kong Country 2: Diddy's Kong Quest).

TurboGrafx-16 games are the only Virtual Console games to actually run in 60 Hz on PAL Wii systems; this is because the game data was never changed for release in PAL territories, the original hardware itself performed the conversion to a 50 Hz signal.

One example of a poor PAL conversion is seen in the Virtual Console release of Sonic the Hedgehog, which retains the slower framerate, music and borders of the original PAL Mega Drive version, despite the fact that the GameCube release Sonic Mega Collection allows PAL users to choose which version of the game they want to play.

During Nintendo's "Hanabi Festival" campaign, certain titles that were never released in Europe were being added to the Wii Virtual Console. Some of these games, namely Japan-only titles such as Super Mario Bros.: The Lost Levels, are run in 60 Hz only, thus keeping the original speed and gameplay. A small reminder is shown when previewing the game's channel.

The Hanabi games can be played in both PAL60 (480i) and 480p modes. This makes these releases look significantly better on progressive displays such as LCD TVs. The fast moving sprites in NES and SNES games generally create a significant amount of interlace artifacts on such displays that the 480p option resolves. However Hanabi Mega Drive titles still run in 50 Hz with the usual PAL conversion problems, despite not been released in PAL.

Initially, some PAL Virtual Console games would not display correctly on high-definition televisions when connected via the component lead. However, starting with an update on April 13, 2007, certain newly added games, such as Punch-Out!!, support the "Wii Component Cable Interlace Mode". This is a temporary fix to problems with various Virtual Console games being played over component cable on HDTVs.

The PAL versions of all 3D Classics games on the Nintendo 3DS except Xevious and TwinBee run much smoother at 60 Hz unlike the Wii's Virtual Console versions which only run at 50 Hz, mainly due to the fact the 3DS versions are semi-modified ports of their original NES and arcade versions. The Ambassador and full release versions of the NES games on the 3DS also run at 60 Hz, but NES games on the Wii U eShop are again running the PAL 50 Hz version.

When Nintendo 64 games were released on the Wii U Virtual Console, they were running at 50 Hz again. Super Mario 64 runs at 60 Hz, however Donkey Kong 64'' only runs at 50 Hz.

See also
Sega Forever

Notes

References

Notes

Nintendo services
Online video game services
Nintendo emulators
Multi-emulators
Video game platform emulators
Nintendo Entertainment System emulators
Super Nintendo Entertainment System emulators
Nintendo 64 emulators
Game Boy emulators
Game Boy Advance emulators
Nintendo DS emulators
Sega Master System emulators
Sega Genesis emulators
Game Gear emulators
TurboGrafx-16 emulators
Neo Geo emulators
MSX emulators
Commodore 64 emulators
Arcade video game emulators
Wii
Nintendo 3DS
Wii U
Products and services discontinued in 2023